Unofficial South American Championships in Athletics (Campeonato Sudamericano Extraordinario de Atletismo) were held on 19–26 April 1953, at Chile's national stadium, Estadio Nacional in the capital, Santiago.

Medal summary
Medal winners are published.

Men

Women

Medal table (unofficial)

References

External links
gbrathletics.com

U 1953
1953 in Chilean sport
1953 in athletics (track and field)
International athletics competitions hosted by Chile
1953 in South American sport